Uri Assembly constituency is one of the 87 constituencies in the Jammu and Kashmir Legislative Assembly of Jammu and Kashmir a north state of India. Uri is also part of Baramulla Lok Sabha constituency.

Member of Legislative Assembly

Election results

2014

See also
 Uri, Jammu and Kashmir
 Baramulla district
 List of constituencies of Jammu and Kashmir Legislative Assembly

References

Assembly constituencies of Jammu and Kashmir
Baramulla district
Uri, Jammu and Kashmir